Coiba is the largest island in Central America, with an area of , off the Pacific coast of the Panamanian province of Chiriquí. It is part of the Tolé District of that province.

History

Coiba separated from continental Panama about 12,000 to 18,000 years ago when sea levels rose. Plants and animals on the new island became isolated from mainland populations and over the millennia most animals have diverged in appearance and behaviour from their mainland counterparts. The island is home to many endemic subspecies, including the Coiba Island howler monkey, the Coiba agouti and the Coiba spinetail.

Coiba was home to the Coiba Cacique Indians until about 1560, when they were conquered by the Spanish and forced into slavery. 

In 1919 a penal colony was built on the island and during the years that Panama was under the dictatorships of Omar Torrijos and Manuel Noriega, the prison on Coiba was a feared place with a reputation for brutal conditions, extreme tortures, executions and political murder. Nobody knows exactly how many people were killed in the prison during this period, but sources claim that the number could be close to three hundred. As such, the island was avoided by locals, and other than the prison, was completely undeveloped.

After the prison was closed down in 2004, the island's pristine condition made it ideal as a reserve. It is now said that the prison is haunted by the ghosts of prisoners. One story is that a guard was chasing a prisoner, but the prisoner was a ghost. The guard was so scared that he shot himself. It is also one of the last places in Central America where the scarlet macaw can be found in large numbers in the wild. The island is about 75% forested with a large fraction standing ancient forest. Coiba Island is home to rare flora and fauna found only on the island. The island also harbours tree species that have long disappeared from the mainland due to deforestation and overharvesting.

Coiba National Park
In 1992, Panama created Coiba National Park, encompassing over 1,042 square miles of islands, forests, beaches, mangroves and coral reefs, and in July 2005, Unesco declared it a World Heritage Site.
The park includes Coiba island, 38 smaller islands off the southwest coast of Panama, and the surrounding marine areas within the Gulf of Chiriquí
providing protection for coral reefs, humpback whales, pilot whales, killer whales, dolphins, sea turtles, manta rays, marlins and other marine creatures.

Due to the Gulf of Chiriquí's capacity to buffer against the effects of El Niño temperature swings, the marine ecosystems within Coiba National Park harbor a high degree of biodiversity. The park harbors 760 species of marine fishes, 33 species of sharks and 20 species of cetaceans.

References

External links

Coiba National Park
Video of diving in Coiba

Pacific islands of Panama
World Heritage Sites in Panama
Veraguas Province
Protected areas established in 1992
1992 establishments in Panama
National parks of Panama